Joe Samuel Frank (November 14, 1942 – October 27, 2022) was an American politician who was the mayor of Newport News, Virginia. A native of Newport News, and a lawyer he was first elected mayor for the term starting July 1, 1996. He was re-elected in May 1998, 2002, and 2006. His last term expired on June 30, 2010. He was the first directly-elected mayor in the history of the city. Frank was an Eagle Scout and was awarded the Distinguished Eagle Scout Award in 2009. In honor to this occasion, the Captain's Lounge in the Rappahannock Scout Camp at Bayport Scout Reservation was to be named in his honor. 

Frank was a father and grandfather. He died at his home in Newport News on October 27, 2022, at the age of 79.

References

External links

1942 births
2022 deaths
University of Virginia alumni
Mayors of Newport News, Virginia
Virginia Democrats